Serbia competed at the 2020 Summer Paralympics in Tokyo, Japan, from 24 August to 5 September 2021.

Medalists

Disability classifications

Every participant at the Paralympics has their disability grouped into one of five disability categories; amputation, the condition may be congenital or sustained through injury or illness; cerebral palsy; wheelchair athletes, there is often overlap between this and other categories; visual impairment, including blindness; Les autres, any physical disability that does not fall strictly under one of the other categories, for example dwarfism or multiple sclerosis. Each Paralympic sport then has its own classifications, dependent upon the specific physical demands of competition. Events are given a code, made of numbers and letters, describing the type of event and classification of the athletes competing. Some sports, such as athletics, divide athletes by both the category and severity of their disabilities, other sports, for example swimming, group competitors from different categories together, the only separation being based on the severity of the disability.

Athletics  

Men's Field Events

Women's Track Events

Women's Field Events

Cycling

Road

Powerlifting

Shooting

Serbia entered six athletes into the Paralympic competition. All of them successfully break the Paralympic qualification at the 2018 WSPS World Championships which was held in Cheongju, South Korea and two others from 2019 WSPS World Championships which was held in Sydney, Australia.

Swimming

Table tennis

Serbia entered five athletes into the table tennis competition at the games. Borislava Peric-Rankovic qualified from 2019 ITTF European Para Championships which was held in Helsingborg, Sweden and other four athletes via World Ranking allocation.

Men

Women

Taekwondo

Serbia qualified two athletes to compete at the Paralympics competition. All of them qualified by finishing top six in world rankings.

See also
Serbia at the 2020 Summer Olympics

References

Nations at the 2020 Summer Paralympics
2020
2021 in Serbian sport